Paul Mpande Ngobeni (1 September 1960) is a South African lawyer who graduated from Hamilton College, New York. He has served on a task team advising the African National Congress on constitutional law matters where he assisted in designing its legal strategy for defending South African President Jacob Zuma against corruption charges. He has also served as a consultant for the South African Ministry of Housing on various legal matters, including transformation.

Early years and legal career 
Ngobeni was born in Lydenburg, Transvaal Province, South Africa in 1960. He went to the United States on a scholarship in 1982 graduated with a BA from Hamilton College, New York, and a JD from New York University School of Law. Ngobeni was admitted to practise law in the State of Connecticut December 1989  and to the State of Massachusetts on 14 June 1990  During his practice in the United States, Mr Ngobeni litigated many cases which have been published and were for the most part cases of first impression, such as the case of Scott v. Robert Jamison, et al., where he (unsuccessfully) defended Robert Jamison against complaints from Juliet Scott that she was physically and verbally assaulted and harassed, denied equal services, and threatened with eviction on the basis of her race and colour and of her children's race and colour in violation of General Statutes § 46a-64c(a) and Title VIII of the Civil Rights Act of 1968, as amended, 42 U.S.C. 3601 et seq.

Notable cases in the U.S 
In 2002, Kweku Hanson, a fellow Connecticut attorney, initiated a class-action suit against Ocwen Federal FSB of West Palm Beach, Florida, and he was represented in this by Paul Ngobeni. The 123-page lawsuit in Hanson v. Ocwen Federal Bank outlines a six-year running battle over late charges and fees.

"It is clear that this is a pattern and practice of sheer piracy," Mr. Hanson said in an interview. He was joined in the suit by 57 individuals who claimed to have been injured by Ocwen. The lawsuit sought $1.5 billion in punitive and exemplary damages, but was settled out of court for an undisclosed sum.

During 2003, he, along with Kweku Hanson, his associate from the Ocwen class action suit, represented three plaintiffs who claimed to represent "all persons who lived in South Africa between 1948 and the present and who suffered damages as a result of apartheid." Punitive and compensatory damages in excess $400 billion were claimed from a "slew" of multinational corporations (including IBM, Citigroup, GE, DuPont and many others) that did business in apartheid South Africa for violations of international law subject to suit in United States federal district court under the
Alien Tort Claims Act, 28 U.S.C. § 1350 ("ATCA"), and other jurisdictional provisions. The Southern District Court of New York under Judge John E. Sprizzo found for defendants' motion to dismiss the complaint. That finding was partially vacated by the US Court of Appeal (Second Circuit) in an appeal first lodged in January 2006 and decided in October 2007 but by then Mr Ngobeni was no longer representing the claimants, and Kweku Hanson was facing some legal difficulties—he pleaded guilty to two counts of sexual assault in the second degree; two counts of risk of injury to a minor child; one charge of possession of child pornography in the first degree; and two counts of tampering with a witness. He received a total effective sentence of twenty-five years execution suspended after he served six years incarceration followed by thirty years of probation.

Accusations of malpractice and disbarment in the US

On 27 September 2005, the Connecticut Office of the Chief Disciplinary Counsel filed an application for the interim suspension of Paul Ngobeni, alleging that he "pose[d] a substantial threat of irreparable harm to his clients or to prospective clients." On 19 December 2005, after he failed to appear for a hearing on this application, a judge in the Superior Court for the Hartford Judicial District in Connecticut ordered that he be placed on interim suspension.

On 20 January 2006, bar counsel filed a petition in Massachusetts for reciprocal discipline based on the interim suspension order entered in Connecticut. On 16 March 2006, the court issued an order of immediate temporary suspension, after Ngobeni had failed to respond.
In a presentment filed in the Connecticut Superior Court on 25 September 2006, disciplinary counsel in Connecticut alleged seventeen counts of misconduct involving sixteen separate clients. The presentment, as amended, included allegations that the respondent took fees without providing services, was incompetent, lacked diligence, failed to communicate with clients, engaged in misrepresentation and deceit, failed to explain an overdraft in his clients' funds account, failed to safeguard clients' funds, and failed to respond to requests for information from the Connecticut bar discipline authorities.

On 14 August 2007, Ngobeni returned to South Africa, his country of origin. On 17 October 2007, a judge in the Connecticut Superior Court held a hearing on the presentment, which Ngobeni did not attend, and on that day, the judge entered an order disbarring Ngobeni for a period of thirteen years. The order conditioned reinstatement on Ngobeni's presenting a practice plan acceptable to the court, on his not practicing as a solo practitioner, on his maintaining malpractice insurance, and on his paying restitution to affected clients.

On 29 November 2007, Ngobeni and Connecticut disciplinary counsel attended a hearing in the Connecticut Superior Court to consider Ngobeni's resignation from the Connecticut bar. Without abandoning his previously filed jurisdictional challenge to the disbarment proceeding, Paul Ngobeni acknowledged that the court had jurisdiction to open that proceeding to consider the submission of his resignation. He further acknowledged that he was freely and voluntarily submitting his resignation, that he understood that he was entitled to be represented by counsel but chose not to be, and that he was giving up his right to reapply for admission to the Connecticut bar at any time in the future.

At the hearing, Paul Ngobeni stated that he was resigning because he intended never to practice law in the United States again, that he intended to return to South Africa the following day, and that he wished to avoid returning to the United States to pursue "lengthy appeals or prolonged proceedings" related to his disbarment. He also stated that "[his] resignation does not in any way constitute any admission of liability of wrongdoing or misconduct on [his] part" and that he was conceding nothing with respect to his jurisdictional challenges to his disbarment proceedings. The assistant disciplinary counsel made clear that she was not "conceding in any way any of the issues that have been raised by [Ngobeni] in opposition to the presentment" and was prepared to prosecute the charges of misconduct set forth in the presentment if the respondent did not resign. She further stated:

"[A]s Mr. Ngobeni commented, he talked to [disciplinary counsel] [who] I think informed him that this resignation will be reported. There's a national databank. . . . And we have made no representations to Mr. Ngobeni . . . as to how other jurisdictions may handle this particular resignation. We do agree to the opening of the judgment for the sole purpose of Mr. Ngobeni submitting his resignation and waiver because it does in the end meet the goals of attorney discipline inasmuch as Mr. Ngobeni will never be allowed to practice in Connecticut again [and] . . . [s]o the profession is protected and the public is protected."

The judge then vacated the order of disbarment and accepted the respondent's resignation and waiver of future reinstatement conditional only on the receipt of a report from the Statewide Grievance Committee required under Connecticut Practice Book § 2- 52 (2008).

Paul Ngobeni did not report his disbarment or subsequent resignation to bar counsel in Massachusetts, as required by S.J.C. Rule 4:01, § 16 (6). On 29 November 2007, having been apprised of the disbarment through other sources, bar counsel filed a petition for reciprocal discipline in the county court seeking a reciprocal order of disbarment in Massachusetts pursuant to § 16. On 19 December, after learning from a source other than Mr Ngobeni that he had resigned from the bar in Connecticut, bar counsel filed an amended petition for reciprocal discipline, requesting that the respondent's resignation in Massachusetts pursuant to S.J.C. Rule 4:01, § 15, as appearing in 425 Mass. 1319 (1997), and § 16 (1), be accepted effective 5 June 2006, the date of the respondent's compliance with the order of temporary suspension. A copy of this pleading was sent to Paul Ngobeni in South Africa. On 21 December 2007, the court issued an order of notice requiring the respondent to show cause within thirty days of service why the "imposition of the identical discipline" would not be warranted.

On 24 March 2008, Paul Ngobeni filed a "verified opposition to the amended petition for reciprocal discipline" and a memorandum of law. Because he resided in South Africa, a telephonic hearing before the single justice on the amended petition for reciprocal discipline was scheduled for 3 April 2008, but attempts to contact Ngobeni at the telephone number he provided were unsuccessful at that time. The court therefore considered the matter on the briefs of the parties, and reserved and reported the case. The single justice indicated that in his view, under S.J.C. Rule 4:01, § 16 (1), (3), and (5), it appeared that he did not "have authority to disbar the respondent or deem that he has resigned from the bar of the Commonwealth."

Finally, the Supreme Judicial Court found that a reciprocal sanction under Supreme Judicial Court Rule 4:01, § 16, may be imposed on an attorney who, with disciplinary charges pending in another jurisdiction, resigned from practice there without making admissions or having a finding made of misconduct, and, accordingly, disbarred Paul Ngobeni from practicing as an attorney in the state of Massachusetts. In so holding, the Court relied in part on a similar decision it had made the previous year, Anusavice v. Board of Registration in Dentistry, 451 Mass. 786, 797 (2008), indicating that the Massachusetts dentistry board could consider a dentist's agreement to a Rhode Island consent order restricting his practice in Rhode Island as "discipline" warranting reciprocal discipline in Commonwealth.

The Court in Ngobeni emphasized the policy concerns underlying the decision, stating that:

"If an attorney like [Ngobeni] may permanently resign in another State in the face of serious allegations of misconduct—here involving multiple clients—but do so without admission of misconduct, and then practice in Massachusetts without restriction unless bar counsel undertakes the burdensome and expensive task of investigating and proving the other State's charges, it would "tend to undermine public confidence in the effectiveness of attorney disciplinary procedures and threaten harm to the administration of justice and to innocent clients."

On 16 May 2011, the Supreme Court of the United States issued an order disbarring him from practice in that court.

References

1960 births
Living people
People from Lydenburg
20th-century South African lawyers
Connecticut lawyers
Disbarred lawyers
Hamilton College (New York) alumni
New York University School of Law alumni
Class action lawsuits
Jacob Zuma
21st-century South African lawyers